The 58th Rifle Division was an infantry division of the Red Army formed during the interwar period. Its second formation during World War II gained the Oder honorific.

History 
The 58th Rifle Division, as it was first known, was formed in 1932 as a result of Mikhail Tukhachevsky's army reforms which established a number of new divisions. Its first recorded commander and commissar was Vasily Polyakov, who took the position in April 1932. Polyakov transferred to command the 96th Rifle Division in December 1933, and was replaced by assistant division commander Grigory Kaptsevich (who received the rank of kombrig in 1935 when the Red Army introduced personal ranks). During the 1935 Kiev Military District maneuvers, the division took on the role of an airborne division as a demonstration as the Red Army did not yet include airborne divisions. Kaptsevich was arrested during the Great Purge on 13 August 1937 and ultimately executed.

The division was headquartered at Cherkasy as part of the Kiev Military District. It participated in 1940 in the Soviet occupation of Bessarabia and northern Bukovina. After that, it remained at peacetime strength until January 1941 when it was re-formed as the 58th Mountain Rifle Division.

The 58th Mountain Rifle Division was surrounded and destroyed along with other parts of the 6th and 12th armies. Its commander, Major General Nikolay Proshkin, was captured and died in January 1942  in a prisoner of war camp, Commissar M. Pozhidaev disappeared without a trace.
The division was disbanded on September 19, 1941.

Organization on Formation 
The division was first formed in 1932 as the 58th Rifle Division.  In Cherkasy the division had the following structure:

 170th Rifle Regiment
 279th Rifle Regiment
 335th Rifle Regiment
 244th Artillery Regiment
138th Howitzer Regiment

Organization on Disbandment 
Organization of the division before it was destroyed during the Uman pocket:

 Headquarters
 170th Rifle Regiment
 279th Rifle Regiment
 335th Rifle Regiment
 368th Rifle Regiment
 244th Artillery Regiment
 258th Howitzer Regiment
 138th Anti-Tank Battalion
 125th Anti-Aircraft Battalion
 81st Reconnaissance Battalion
 126th Engineer Battalion
 100th Signal Battalion
 114th Medical Battalion
 132nd Supply Battalion
 105th Chemical Defense Company
 Also Attached
59th Field Bakery
258th Field Post Station
353rd Field Ticket Officer of the State Bank

Commanders 
The division had a number of divisional commanders, including:

 Major General Nikolay Ignatevich Proshkin
 Colonel Nikolay Nikolayevich Shkodunovich
 Major General Vasiliy Akimovich Samsonov

References

Citations

Bibliography 

 

Infantry divisions of the Soviet Union in World War II